"Caravan Girl" is a song by English electronic music duo Goldfrapp from their fourth studio album, Seventh Tree (2008). Written and produced by Alison Goldfrapp and Will Gregory, the song was released as the album's third single on 30 June 2008 and peaked at number 54 on the UK Singles Chart. In Scotland, the song reached number 6, becoming the third single from Seventh Tree to reach the top 10.

Music video
The music video premiered on Channel 4 on 14 June 2008, and Mute Records made the video available on YouTube the following day. The video, which is Goldfrapp's first not to include Alison Goldfrapp, features a girl riding her longboard. It was filmed, among other places, in Cambria, California. The video was directed by The Malloys.

Track listings

CD single #1 (UK)
"Caravan Girl" – 4:04
"Happiness" (Video) – 3:41

CD single #2 (UK)
"Caravan Girl" (Live Choral Version) – 4:44
"Monster Love" (Live Acoustic Version) – 4:41
"Little Bird" (Live at the Union Chapel) (Video) – 6:35

7-inch single (UK)
A. "Caravan Girl" (Edit) – 3:40
B. "Little Bird" (Animal Collective Remix) – 3:19

Digital single
"Caravan Girl" – 4:05
"Caravan Girl" (Live Choral Version) – 4:42
"Little Bird" (Animal Collective Remix) – 3:19
"Monster Love" (Live Acoustic Version) – 4:38
"Winter Wonderland" – 3:10

Personnel
The following people contributed to "Caravan Girl":
Alison Goldfrapp – vocals
Flood – co-producer, keyboards, mixing
Alex Lee – acoustic guitar
Tony Hoffer – bass guitar, engineering, mixing
Adrian Utley – bass, guitar
Chris Goulstone – drum samples
Aidan Love – keyboards
The Metro Voices – choir
Jenny O'Grady – choir master
Stephen Marcussen – mastering
Bill Mims – engineering, mixing assistant

Charts

References

2008 singles
Goldfrapp songs
Electronic songs
Mute Records singles
Songs written by Will Gregory
Songs written by Alison Goldfrapp
Song recordings produced by Flood (producer)
Music videos directed by The Malloys
2007 songs